Solomon Grayzel (1896–1980) was an American historian who authored A History of the Jews and testified as an expert witness in Abington School District v. Schempp, the case that declared school-sponsored Bible reading in American public schools to be unconstitutional.  Among other topics, his scholarly research focused on the relationship between the Vatican and the Jews, including The Church and the Jews in the XIIIth Century and many other scholarly essays and books on the topic.

Grayzel was born on February 18, 1896, in Minsk, a major hub of Eastern European Jewry prior to the Holocaust which is now the capital of Belarus. He emigrated to the United States as an adolescent, settling in the Brownsville section of Brooklyn, New York, with his family in 1908. Grayzel received a Bachelor of Arts degree from the City College of New York in 1917 and a Master of Arts degree in sociology from Columbia University in 1920.  He received his semikhah (rabbinical ordination) from the Conservative Movement at the Jewish Theological Seminary of America in 1921, and earned a Ph.D. in history from Dropsie College in 1926.  While working on his doctorate, Grayzel took his first and only full-time pulpit position at Congregation Beth El in Camden, New Jersey.  He was the editor-in-chief of the Jewish Publication Society from 1939-1966.

References 

1896 births
1980 deaths
Belarusian Jews
American people of Belarusian-Jewish descent
20th-century American historians
American male non-fiction writers
Jewish American historians
Historians of Jews and Judaism
Writers from Minsk
People from Brownsville, Brooklyn
Writers from Brooklyn
City College of New York alumni
Columbia Graduate School of Arts and Sciences alumni
Jewish Theological Seminary of America semikhah recipients
Dropsie College alumni
Belarusian emigrants to the United States
20th-century American rabbis
Historians from New York (state)
20th-century American male writers